Avilionella is a Middle Ordovician tarphyceroid genus consisting of closely coiled, compressed shells with a small perforation in the center, shallow dorsal impression, and subventral tubular siphuncle with thin connecting rings. Chambers are very short, separated by closely spaced, dish-shaped septa. Coiling becomes loose in the mature, adoral, part of the shell.

The subventral, tubular siphuncle along with the  looser coiling in the mature portion of the shell and perforation at the center put Avilionella in the Plectoceratidae (Flower, 1984) rather than in the Barrandeoceratidae (Sweet 1964) where it had been placed earlier. It has been found the New York and Ontario.

References

Rousseau H. Flower, 1984. Bodeiceras; a New Mohawkian Oxycone, with Revision of the Older Barrandeocerida and Discussion of the Status of the Order. Journal of Paleontology v. 58, no.6, pp 1372–1379, Nov. 1984.
Walter C Sweet, 1964  Nautiloidea-Barrandeocerida; Treatise on Invertebrate Paleontology, Part K Mollusca 3. Geological Society of America and University of Kansas Press.

Prehistoric nautiloid genera
Ordovician cephalopods of North America